Madeleine Dale Thompson (born April 24, 1991) is an American soccer defender from Corvallis, Oregon. She played for Sky Blue FC in the National Women's Soccer League (NWSL).

Early life
Thompson attended and played for Corvallis High School in Corvallis, Oregon. While at Corvallis, Thompson lettered four years in soccer, lettered twice in track and three times on the downhill ski racing team. She also won four league soccer championships, reached the 2007 state soccer semifinals, and was on the 2007 state championship ski team. Thompson was named to the 2008 5A All-State second team by The Oregonian and awarded her high school's Award of Excellence for exemplary sportsmanship, ethics and integrity and is also her high school's freshman record-holder in the 1,500 meters in track. Thompson played club for the FC Willamette Pride, four-time Oregon State Cup semifinalists and played on the Oregon Olympic Development Program team.

Stanford University 
Thompson attended Stanford University where she majored in Industrial and Product Design. Played soccer for four years at Stanford and spent the winter quarter of 2012 in Florence, Italy.

Club career
Thompson was signed by Sky Blue FC as a discovery player before the start of the inaugural National Women's Soccer League season. Thompson role on Sky Blue, thus far, has been as a late in the second half sub.

On September 25, 2014, she announced her retirement.

Personal life
Thompson's parents are Eric and Carrie Thompson. Thompson has an older sister and a twin brother. Thompson plays the flute and was at one time the only high school member of the Oregon State University Symphony.

References

External links
  Madeleine Thompson profile at National Women's Soccer League
 Madeleine Thompson profile at Sky Blue FC
 Stanford University player profile

1991 births
Living people
NJ/NY Gotham FC players
National Women's Soccer League players
American women's soccer players
Stanford Cardinal women's soccer players
Sportspeople from Corvallis, Oregon
Soccer players from Oregon
Corvallis High School (Oregon) alumni
Women's association football defenders